Ferrocarril Mexicano may refer to:
Ferrocarril Mexicano (1998), commonly known as Ferromex, a private rail consortium, one of the two largest (Ferrosur)
Ferrocarril Mexicano (1867-1959), officially known as Mexican Railway, owner of a line between Mexico City and Veracruz